1923 Kamchatka earthquake may refer to:

 February 1923 Kamchatka earthquake
 April 1923 Kamchatka earthquake and tsunami

See also 
 Kamchatka earthquake